The Indian Memory Project is an online archive that aims to trace the history of the Indian subcontinent using images and narratives offered by families and individuals in several countries. It was founded in February 2010 by Indian photographer Anusha Yadav. The ongoing project attempts to convey in a unified way the history of the subcontinent, its experiences, humanity, choices and its circumstances that have made the region and its people who they are. It is also intended to promote greater tolerance, understanding, and capacity for learning among the citizens of India, its neighbouring countries and the world.

The project employs photographs, contextualised narratives and letters found in personal archives, highlighting themes such as social transformation, new professions, partition, education, war, marriage, religion and culture, and the impact they had on families living during these times. With personal images serving as evidence, each post on the archive reveals information about people, families and ancestors, cultures, lifestyles, traditions, choices, circumstances and thereby consequences. Indian Memory Project has received images from families and people based in Canada, USA, Ireland, Bangladesh, Pakistan, India, United Kingdom. Currently the oldest photograph is from 1860.

The project received an honorary mention in the  Digital Communities category at the 2013 Prix Ars Electronica, Austria.

References

History in the Making. Hindustan Times. January 2014
NY Daily News, December 19. 2013
On nostalgia. Economic Times – 2015. By Vikram Doctor
Click, Save, Forget : Times of India. April 2016
Open Magazine. March 26, 2010  A Family Album of India''.Mumbai Mirror & Bangalore Mirror. Ankit Ajmera, January 23, 2011/January 30, 2011 A Secret HistoryOutlook India, April 11, 2011 Diachronic LensesIndian Express, Sharon Fernandes April 17, 2011 This used to be meEconomic Times, Deepika Sorabjee, May 2, 2012 Archiving through personal records with an interface like Facebook has made old worlds come aliveThe Hindu, Geeta Padmanabhan, July 4, 2012 Portal to the pas tTimes of India, Bangalore, Shrabonti Bagchi August 4, 2012.  The Record of Small ThingsVerve Magazine, August 2012 Memoirs of a NationThe History Workshop, UK, March, 2013Guide to India , Italy. June 6, 2013Financial Express. by Kunal Doley. August 2014Homegrown.in''' February 2015
  Telegraph United Kingdom, 2010
  Gulf News, UAE 2010. http://gulfnews.com/news/gulf/oman/a-first-hand-look-at-history-1.653821
  Wall Street Journal 2010.
  The Herald, Pakistan. 2012.http://www.indianmemoryproject.com/wp-content/uploads/2012/08/magazinespread_low.pdf
  BBC Radio Hindi 2013.
  Telerama, France 2014.
  Open Magazine, India 2010. 
  Outlook, India 2011. 
  Indian Express, India 2011.

External links

Anusha Yadav

Archives in India
Historic preservation in India
History websites
Internet properties established in 2010